Lola Yoʻldosheva (sometimes spelled Lola Yuldasheva in English) (born September 4, 1985), better known simply as Lola, is an Uzbek singer, songwriter and film actress. She rose to prominence in Uzbekistan with her song "Muhabbatim" ("My Love") in 2003. Lola has recorded songs both in Uzbek and Russian.

Lola's first studio movie appearance was in the 2004 Uzbek film Sevinch. She received positive reviews for her performance in the film both from movie critics and fans. Her acting career reached a new high as a result of her starring role in the 2005 comedy Kelgindi kuyov ("The Alien Bridegroom"). Since then she has acted in several Uzbek movies.

In 2005, Lola got married and went on an indefinite hiatus, but returned to show business in 2011 with a series of solo concerts. In 2015, she was given a warning by Uzbeknavo, Uzbekistan's government agency that issues licenses to performers, for wearing a red low-back dress that “conflicts with the national mentality” while performing a duet with Rayhon. This controversy led to the suspension of Lola's license by Uzbeknavo in July 2015. In November 2019, Lola released a music video for her single "Sevgingni menga ayt" (Tell Me About Your Love) in which she criticized censorship of singers and musicians in Uzbekistan. The video, which was directed by Lola herself, went viral and was hailed as a "social protest" and "revolutionary" by many critics and fans.

Life 
Lola Yoʻldosheva was born on September 4, 1985, in Samarkand to Ravshanbek Yoʻldoshev, founder of the record label Tarona Records and Gulnara Yoʻldosheva. She has two younger sisters, Anora and Asal, younger brother Rustam. Shahzoda's son Halid is her step-brother.

In 2005, Lola married Shohruh, a businessman from Tashkent. They have two children: Shahinabegim and Shohdiyor. The couple divorced in 2011.

Career 
Lola initially performed under the stage name of Maya and sang mostly in Russian. She rose to prominence in Uzbekistan with her song "Muhabbatim" ("My Love") in 2003. In October 2005, Lola got married and went on an indefinite hiatus, but returned to show business in November 2011 with a series of solo concerts entitled "Senga" ("For You").

Lola made her film debut in the 2004 Uzbek film Sevinch. The film did well in theaters and Lola received positive reviews for her portrayal of a girl with cancer. Her song "Orzu" was among the songs included in the soundtrack for the movie.

Lola became highly popular within the Uzbek film industry in 2005 with her leading role in the popular comedy Kelgindi kuyov (The Alien Bridegroom). Since then she has acted in several films.

2015 controversy 
Lola was given a warning by Uzbeknavo, Uzbekistan's government agency that issues licenses to performers, for wearing a red low-back dress that “conflicts with the national mentality” while performing the song "Koʻnikmadim" with Rayhon at the latter's concert on 24 February 2015.

In March 2015, Uzbeknavo issued a directive that female singers were no longer to wear clothing that exposed their shoulders or legs, that they were not to appear “half-naked” at public events, and that they were not to include any sexually suggestive moves on stage. Deputy Prime Minister and chairperson of Uzbekistanʼs State Women’s Committee Elmira Bositkhonova was quoted as saying “How can one explain the fact that some of our female singers are dressed in a more than revealing style, completely divorced from the national style, and appear on television channels intended for family viewing, singing songs with messages that aren’t subjected to any criticism and in frivolous video clips?” Following Bositkhonova's remarks, Uzbeknavo suspended Lolaʼs license on 14 July 2015.

2019 censorship video 
In November 2019, Lola released a second music video for her single "Sevgingni menga ayt" (Tell Me About Your Love) in her personal YouTube channel in which she criticized censorship of singers and musicians in Uzbekistan. The video, which was directed by Lola herself, went viral and was hailed as a "social protest" and "revolutionary" by many critics and fans, including the well-known Uzbek director Ali Hamroyev. Uzbek government officials, however, criticized the music video, saying that "all clips, all music and songs must adhere to the Uzbek mentality." In 2020, the singer deleted her YouTube channel along with all of her videos.

Discography

Studio albums 

Lola has released 7 studio albums to date.
 Netayin? (2002)
 Muhabbatim (2004)
 Topdim baxtimni (2005)
 Imkon ber (2010)
 Senga (2011)
 Sogʻindim (2012)
 Kel (2014)

Music videos

Filmography

Actress

Screenwriter

Awards 
Lola has received several awards throughout her career. She received a Tarona Award, an accolade given to recognize outstanding achievement in the music industry of Uzbekistan, for Best Stage Outfit in 2004. She won the same award in 2005. Lola won another Tarona for Best Female Singer in 2005.

References

External links 

Official YouTube channel
Official Instagram page

1985 births
Uzbeks
Living people
Actors from Tashkent
Uzbekistani film actresses
21st-century Uzbekistani women singers
21st-century Uzbekistani actresses
Russian-language singers
Musicians from Tashkent